Pitkänen is a Finnish surname. Notable people with the surname include:

 Ilmari Pitkänen, (1880–1927), Finnish writer
 Ilmari Pitkänen (born 1990), Finnish ice hockey player
 Joni Pitkänen (born 1983), Finnish ice hockey player
 Matti Pitkänen (born 1951), Finnish cross-country skier
 Miikka Pitkänen (born 1996), Finnish ice hockey player
 Pauli Pitkänen (1911–1941), Finnish cross-country skier
 Riku Pitkänen (born 1991), Finnish ice hockey player
 Toimi Pitkänen (born 1928), Finnish rower

Finnish-language surnames